The Name of the Rose is the second studio album released by the melodic hard rock band Ten. The album was released only four months apart from the band's first album X, since the songs were already written and recorded.

Track listing
All songs written by Gary Hughes except where noted.
 "The Name of the Rose" – 8:31
 "Wildest Dreams" – 5:33
 "Don't Cry" – 5:00
 "Turn Around" – 3:52
 "Pharaoh's Prelude: Ascension to the Afterlife" – 3:54
 "Wait For You" – 5:31
 "The Rainbow" – 6:03 (Gary Hughes, Zoe Hughes)
 "Through the Fire" – 8:19
 "Goodnight Saigon" – 7:02
 "Wings of the Storm" – 5:02
 "Standing In Your Light" – 7:18
Bonus Tracks Release Europe:
"The Quest" – 4:52
 "You're My Religion" – 6:48
2015 japanese SHM-CD remaster (AVALON  MICP-11209) bonus tracks:
"The Quest" - 4:52
 "Round & Round" - 5:27

Personnel
Gary Hughes – vocals
Vinny Burns – Lead guitars
John Halliwell – Rhythm guitars
Ged Rylands – keyboards
 Martin "Shelley" Shelton – bass guitar
Greg Morgan – drums
Mark Harrison – bass guitar
Brian Cox – keyboards
Howard Smith – keyboards
Andy Thompson – keyboards
Jason Thanos – backing vocals (Track 9)
Oliver Bowden – backing vocals (Track 11)
Thierey Cardinet – backing vocals (Track 11)
Damien Guasp – backing vocals (Track 11)
Jee Jacquet – backing vocals (Track 11)

Production
Executive Producers – Mark Ashton and Vinny Burns
Mixing – Mike Stone
Engineer – Mike Stone, Audu Obaje and Ray Brophy

Concepts
"Wildest Dreams" is about a utopic perfect woman. 
"Pharaoh's Prelude" and "Wait for You" are based on Egyptian Mythology.
"The Rainbow" tells the story of a socialite that commits suicide. 
"Goodnight Saigon" is about the Vietnam War.

External links
Heavy Harmonies page

Ten (band) albums
1996 albums
Albums produced by Mike Stone (record producer)